Patricia Eloise Benoit (February 21, 1927 – August 6, 2018) was an American television and stage actress. She starred as the title character's eventual wife Nancy Remington in the 1950s TV series, Mister Peepers.

Early life 
Patricia Benoit was born on  February 21, 1927 in Fort Worth, Texas. At the age of 19, she moved to New York City from Fort Worth to study acting at the American Academy of Dramatic Arts. After her graduation in stage acting, she acted in summer stock and Off Broadway Productions for three years.

Career 
She also made a solitary appearance in the television series Believe It or Not in 1950 before earning a career breakthrough performance in Broadway comedy sitcom Glad Tidings where she played the role of long-lost daughter of Melvyn Douglas. She also received an award for the Best stage actress at the Theatre World Award in 1952. 

She also rose to prominence by playing the role of Wally Cox's sweetheart in the record breaking 1950s NBC television series, Mister Peepers. The wedding moment between her and Wally Cox was a record smashing moment in television history in 1954 and was largely appreciated by the TV audience. The American TV magazine TV Guide used the picture of the couple's television wedding in 1954 in its cover page.

Personal life 
She was married to Patron Swift Jr. from 1952 until his death in 1991.

Death 
She died on August 6, 2018, at the age of 91. She is survived by her two sons, Jeremy and Nicholas.

References

External links 
 

1927 births
2018 deaths
American stage actresses
American film actresses
20th-century American actresses
American television actresses
People from Fort Worth, Texas
21st-century American women